The Sunday Times is a British Sunday newspaper.

It may also refer to:
The Sunday Times Magazine, a magazine included with The Sunday Times
Sunday Times of Ceylon, a defunct Ceylonese newspaper
The Sunday Times (India)
The Sunday Times (Malta)
The Sunday Times (South Africa)
The Sunday Times (Singapore)
The Sunday Times (Sri Lanka)
The Sunday Times (Sydney)
The Sunday Times (Western Australia)
The Sunday Times, the Sunday edition of The New York Times
The Sunday Times, the Sunday edition of The New Times (Rwanda)
The Sunday Times, the Sunday edition of The Scranton Times-Tribune
The New Sunday Times, the Sunday edition of the New Straits Times

See also
Sunday Times-Star
Sunday Star-Times
Sunday Edition (disambiguation)
The Times (disambiguation)